Akbarpur is an H chondrite  meteorite that fell to earth on April 18, 1838, in Uttar Pradesh, India. It is notable for being the first Indian meteorite for which an official report accompanied by a legal deposition was filed.

Classification
It is a polymict that belongs to the petrologic type 4, thus was assigned to the group H4.  Its surface features regmaglypts.

References

See also 
 Glossary of meteoritics
 Meteorite falls
 Ordinary chondrite

Meteorites found in India
Geology of Uttar Pradesh
1838 in British India